Lee Sung-yoon (born 31 October 2000) is a Korean footballer currently playing as a midfielder for Seoul E-Land FC on loan from Jeonbuk Hyundai Motors.

Career statistics

Club

References

2000 births
Living people
South Korean footballers
Association football midfielders
K League 1 players
K League 2 players
Jeonbuk Hyundai Motors players
Seoul E-Land FC players